In mathematical logic, a first-order Gödel logic is a member of a family of finite- or infinite-valued logics in which the sets of truth values V are closed subsets of the interval [0,1] containing both 0 and 1. Different such sets V in general determine different Gödel logics.  The concept is named after Kurt Gödel.

References

Set theory
Mathematical logic
Formal methods